Benjamin Fry (born 26 September 1998) is a Welsh rugby union player who plays for the Dragons as a flanker, having previously played for the Dragons academy, Bargoed and the Dragons U23 side.

Fry made his debut for the Dragons in January 2018 versus Timișoara Saracens in the European Rugby Challenge Cup. Fry scored a debut try in the 59–3 win.

In May 2018, Fry was selected in the Wales Under 20 squad for the 2018 Under 20 World Championships in France, having previously played for Wales Under 16 and Wales Under 18.

His younger brother Harry is a Dragons prospect and England Under-18 international.

References

External links 
Dragons profile
itsrugby.co.uk profile

1998 births
Living people
Dragons RFC players
Rugby union players from Cardiff
Welsh rugby union players
Rugby union flankers